Slide or Slides may refer to:

Places
Slide, California, former name of Fortuna, California

Arts, entertainment, and media

Music

Albums
Slide (Lisa Germano album), 1998
Slide (George Clanton album), 2018
Slide, by Patrick Gleeson, 2007
Slide (Luna EP), 1993
Slide (Madeline Merlo EP), 2022

Songs
"Slide" (The Big Dish song), 1986
"Slide" (Goo Goo Dolls song), 1998
"Slide" (Calvin Harris song), 2017
"Slide" (French Montana song), 2019
"Slide" (H.E.R. song), 2019
"Slide" (Slave song), 1977
"Step Back"/"Slide", by Superheist, 2001
"Slide", by Dido from No Angel
"Slide", by Madeline Merlo from Slide, 2022
"The Slide", by Cowboy Junkies from One Soul Now

Other uses in music
Slide (musical ornament), a musical embellishment found particularly in Baroque music
Slide (tune type), a tune type in Irish traditional music, common to the Sliabh Luachra area
Slide, a 1970s disco side project of Rod McKuen's
The Slide, a jukebox musical using songs by The Beautiful South
Bent note, or slide, articulation 
Glissando, or slide, articulation
Legato, or slide, articulation

Musical instruments
Slide guitar, a guitar playing technique
Slide (wind instrument), part of an instrument used to vary the length of a tube
Slide whistle, a musical instrument using a slide
Trombone, a musical instrument using a slide
Sackbut, the Renaissance and early Baroque forerunner of the trombone

Other uses in arts, entertainment, and media
Slide (dance), a dance move giving the impression of gliding around effortlessly
Slide (TV series), an Australian television drama
The Slide, a 1966 British science fiction radio serial

Fashion
Slide (footwear), a kind of shoe
Slide, also known as a neckerchief slide or woggle, is a ring to hold a neckerchief on a Scout's neck
Barrette, also known as a hair slide in North America

Recreation and sports
Slide (baseball), dropping to the ground when going into a base to avoid being tagged
Slide (skateboarding), skateboarding tricks
Playground slide, a smooth, sloped downward surface on which children slide while sitting 
Sliding tackle, a skill in soccer
Water slide, a form of amusement in which people slide down a wet surface into a swimming pool
Losing slide, an uninterrupted string of contests lost

Technology
Slide (form), a slide-out mobile phone form factor
Slide (hoverboard), a hoverboard developed by Lexus
Tri-glide slide, an item that allows straps to be pulled through it to adjust their length 
Evacuation slide, an inflatable slide used to evacuate an aircraft
Google Slides, a web-based presentation program offered by Google
Jakarta Slide, defunct content management system software
Linear-motion bearing, a bearing designed to provide free motion in one dimension
Microscope slide, a thin glass sheet used to hold objects for examination
Photographic slide or transparency, a positive photograph used for projection
Pistol slide, the upper half of a semi-automatic pistol, containing the barrel, sights, and ejection port
Slide edit, a video editing term for moving a video clip around in a timeline
Slide rule, a simple analog calculator

Other uses
Slide (motion)
Landslide, the movement of soil, mud or rock down a slope
Slide (geography), fixed or settled residue of a landslide that has stabilized
Presentation slide, a document format used for presentations

See also
Slide Lake (disambiguation)
Slider (disambiguation)
Sliding (disambiguation)